Eiður Aron Sigurbjörnsson (born 26 February 1990) is an Icelandic footballer who has played as a defender for Valur. In May 2017 he signed a 2.5 year contract for Valur.

Career
In November 2015, Eiður signed for German 3. Liga side Holstein Kiel until summer 2017. In May 2017, the club announced that Eiður will return to Iceland and transfer to the team Valur.

International
He made his debut for the Iceland national football team on 11 January 2019 in a friendly against Sweden, as a starter.

References

External links

1990 births
Living people
Association football defenders
Eidur Sigurbjornsson
Eidur Sigurbjornsson
Eidur Sigurbjornsson
Örebro SK players
Holstein Kiel players
Allsvenskan players
3. Liga players
Sandnes Ulf players
Eidur Sigurbjornsson
Eliteserien players
Eidur Sigurbjornsson
Expatriate footballers in Sweden
Expatriate footballers in Norway
Expatriate footballers in Germany
Eidur Sigurbjornsson
Eidur Sigurbjornsson
Eidur Sigurbjornsson
Eidur Sigurbjornsson